The year 1800 in architecture involved some significant events.

Buildings and structures

Buildings

 June 30 – Replacement Teatro Riccardi opera house in Bergamo, Lombardy, designed by Giovanni Francesco Lucchini, is opened.
 November 1 – The White House in Washington D.C., United States, is completed. However, the porticoes are not added until 1825.
 The King's Inns in Dublin, designed by James Gandon, are completed.
 Santiago Metropolitan Cathedral in Chile is completed.
 East Cowes Castle on the Isle of Wight, designed by John Nash for his own use, is completed.
 Tyringham Hall near Newport Pagnell in England, designed by John Soane, is completed.
 Gosford House in East Lothian, Scotland, is completed to the 1790 design of Robert Adam (died 1792).

Publications
 Birch's Views of Philadelphia published.

Awards
 Grand Prix de Rome, architecture: Simon Vallot and Jean-François-Julien Mesnager.

Births
 February 27 – Robert Willis, English mechanical engineer, phonetician and architectural historian (died 1875)
 August 17 – Isaiah Rogers, American architect (died 1869)
 September 30 – Decimus Burton, English architect (died 1881)
 December 4 – , French architect (died 1870)

Deaths
 May 21 – Carl August Ehrensvärd, Swedish naval officer, painter, author and neoclassical architect (born 1745)

References

Architecture
Years in architecture
18th-century architecture